Nomi may refer to:

People
 Nomi (name), list of people with the name

Places
 Nōmi, Hiroshima, a town in Hiroshima Prefecture, Japan
 Nomi, Ishikawa, a city in Ishikawa Prefecture in Japan
 Nomi, Trentino, a municipality in Trentino, Italy
 Nomi District, Ishikawa
 North Miami, Florida
Northern Michigan
 North Minneapolis, Minnesota

Other uses
 The Nomi Song, a 2004 documentary about Klaus Nomi
 Japanese chisel
 Non-occlusive mesenteric ischemia
 Nomi (retail chain), network of retail supermarkets

See also
 Naomi (disambiguation)
 Nomis (disambiguation)